The Brandenburg United Civic Movements/Free Voters (German: Brandenburger Vereinigte Bürgerbewegungen/Freie Wähler; BVB/Free Voters or BVB/FW) is a political party in Brandenburg in eastern Germany. The party was co-founded in 2008 by Péter Vida, who serves as chairman. It cooperates with the federal Free Voters association, but is not a member. The party describes itself as "a statewide association of independent municipal voter groups and citizens' initiatives in the state of Brandenburg".

The BVB/FW is active on a local and state level. Its first major success came in the 2014 Brandenburg state election, where it won 2.7% of votes cast and three seats due to the victory of Christoph Schulze, a former SPD member of the Landtag, in his constituency of Teltow-Fläming III. In the 2019 Brandenburg state election, the BVB/FW won 5.05% of the state vote and five seats. Chairman Péter Vida also won the constituency of Barnim II.

Election results

Landtag of Brandenburg

References

Regionalist parties
Political parties in Germany